Major James William Coldwell  (December 2, 1888 – August 25, 1974), usually known as M. J. Coldwell, was a Canadian democratic socialist politician, and leader of the Co-operative Commonwealth Federation (CCF) party from 1942 to 1960.

Born in England, he immigrated to Canada in 1910. Prior to his political career, he had been an educator and union activist. In 1935, he was elected to the House of Commons of Canada, representing the Rosetown—Biggar electoral district. He was re-elected five more times before he was defeated in the 1958 Diefenbaker sweep. He was the CCF's first national secretary in 1934 and became its national leader upon the death of J. S. Woodsworth in 1942. He remained as its leader until 1960, when there was a  parliamentary caucus revolt against him. When the CCF was disbanded 1961, he joined its successor party, the NDP.

He is remembered mainly for helping to introduce "welfare state" policies to Canada, by persuading the Canadian government to introduce an Old Age Security programme, and child benefits during the mid-1940s. Coldwell turned down several offers to cross the floor and join the governing Liberal Party of Canada, including one offer that eventually would have made him the Prime Minister of Canada. After his defeat in 1958, he was offered a Senate appointment but declined it as well. He became a member of the Privy Council in 1964 and in 1967 became one of the initial inductees into the Order of Canada.

Early life
Coldwell was born in Seaton, England on December 2, 1888. While Coldwell attended Exeter University (then called Royal Albert Memorial College), he met Norah Gertrude Dunsford in 1907, and in December 1909, they became engaged. Norah was born in 1888 and was the daughter of a wealthy newspaper proprietor, John Thomas Dunsford. Coldwell left in February 1910 to teach in Canada's Prairie provinces in 1910. He became a school teacher in New Norway, Alberta, and returned to the United Kingdom during his 1912 summer break. They were married at the Wembdon Church in Bridgwater, Somerset, England, on July 22. They honeymooned in England for two weeks and then sailed to Canada, where he continued teaching in Sedley, Saskatchewan. He then became known nationally as a leader of teachers' associations from 1924 to 1934.

Early political career
He first ran for the Canadian House of Commons as a Progressive candidate in Regina in the 1925 federal election but was defeated. He was elected as a city councillor for Regina City Council and developed links with labour and farmers' organizations.

In 1926, Coldwell organized the Independent Labour Party (ILP) in Saskatchewan. In 1929, The Farmers' Political Association and the ILP nominated three candidates for the provincial election, under the joint banner of the Saskatchewan Farmer–Labour party, with Coldwell leading it. The party fought the 1934 provincial election under Coldwell's leadership, and it won five seats in the Legislative Assembly of Saskatchewan, making it the official opposition to the Liberal government. Coldwell was defeated in his election bid. After the election, the party affiliated itself with the Co-operative Commonwealth Federation and became the Saskatchewan CCF.

Elected MP
In 1934, he became the CCF's first national secretary. In the 1935 federal election, Coldwell was elected to the House of Commons as Member of Parliament (MP) for the riding of Rosetown-Biggar. Coldwell also served as the CCF's national chairman from 1938 to 1942. He split with CCF leader J. S. Woodsworth when World War II broke out in 1939. Woodsworth, a pacifist, opposed the war effort, while Coldwell and the rest of the CCF caucus supported the war, and Coldwell's view was the party's official position.

CCF leader
Following Woodsworth's stroke in 1940, Coldwell was appointed parliamentary leader of the CCF in October 1940 while Woodsworth remained the party's honorary president (or leader). Coldwell was unanimously elected the party's new national leader at the party's July 1942 convention, three months following Woodsworth's death. He led the party through five general elections. After an upsurge of support for the party in the mid-1940s, the party embarked on a long decline during the Cold War. The Liberals, appropriating many of the CCF's policies, made them government policy. Liberal governments implemented unemployment insurance, family allowances, and universal old age pensions, which stole much of the CCF's thunder with the electorate, which helped cause the party's electoral fortunes to turn downward during the prosperous 1950s. Coldwell cared much more that his party's policies were becoming law than that he and the rest of the CCF received little credit for the policies.

In 1945, Prime Minister Mackenzie King offered Coldwell a Cabinet post in his government. When Coldwell refused, MacKenzie King made another offer, which would have made him the next Liberal leader and, by extension, the Prime Minister of Canada. Again, Coldwell refused, mainly out of loyalty to his party and its principles and he stated that "if the country needed me in the Prime Minister's chair, then it would be at the head of a Co-operative Commonwealth Federation government and not as a member of a party with views and politics contradictory to those in which I believed." Rumours that King made Coldwell an offer became public during the 1946 by-election campaign in the Parkdale electoral district. On October 11, while attending a rally for the CCF's by-election candidate, Ford Brand, at Parkdale Collegiate Institute, a partisan audience member asked him about the rumour that he had been offered the leadership of the federal Liberal Party. Coldwell responded by stating that there had been no official offer and that "the Liberals thought they could buy Coldwell. Coldwell is not for sale."

1945 elections: disappointment and defeat

Coldwell and the rest of the CCF were looking forward to the Canadian federal and the Ontario elections of 1945, which would possibly be the most crucial to Canada in the 20th century. They took place at the beginning of the welfare state and set the course of political thought to the end of the century and beyond. The year was a disaster for the CCF, both nationally and in Ontario, which Coldwell and the CCF's main players realized at the time. The CCF never fully recovered and, in 1961, it would dissolve and become the New Democratic Party. As NDP strategist and historian Gerald Caplan put it: "June 4 [Ontario], and June 11 [Canada], 1945, proved to be black days in CCF annals: socialism was effectively removed from the Canadian political agenda."

The antisocialist crusade by the Ontario Conservative Party, mostly credited to the Ontario Provincial Police (OPP) special investigative branch's agent D-208 (Captain William J. Osborne-Dempster) and the Conservative propagandists Gladstone Murray and Montague A. Sanderson, diminished the CCF's initially favourable position both provincially and nationally: the September 1943 Gallup poll showed the CCF leading nationally with 29 per cent support, with the Liberals and the Conservatives tied for second place at 28 per cent. By April 1945, the CCF was down to 20 per cent nationally, and on election day it received only 16 per cent.

Another factor in the CCF's defeat was the unofficial coalition between the Liberal Party of Canada and the communist Labor-Progressive Party which guaranteed a split in the left-of-centre vote.

Leadership succession crisis
Coldwell had a moderating influence on party policy, and at the party's biannual convention in Winnipeg in 1956, the party passed the Winnipeg Declaration as a statement of party principles to replace the more radical Regina Manifesto. He pushed the party to accept that there is room for the private sector in a mixed economy in the hope that the new principles would make the CCF more electable.

In the 1958 election, Coldwell lost his House of Commons seat, and the party was reduced to a rump of eight MPs. Prime Minister Diefenbaker offered him a Senate appointment, which he declined. In the period following the election, he was constantly considering resigning as the CCF's leader, but was repeatedly dissuaded by the party's executive. However, the party needed a leader in the House of Commons to replace him because he obviously was no longer a member of parliament. The CCF parliamentary caucus chose Hazen Argue as its new leader in the House. During the leadup to the 1960 CCF convention, Argue was pressing Coldwell to step down. The leadership challenge jeopardized plans for an orderly transition to the new party that was being planned by the CCF and the Canadian Labour Congress. CCF national president David Lewis, who succeeded Coldwell as president in 1958, when the national chairman and national president positions were merged, and the rest of the new party's organizers both opposed Argue's manoeuvres and wanted Saskatchewan premier Tommy Douglas to be the new party's first leader. To prevent their plans from derailing, Lewis unsuccessfully tried to persuade Argue not to force a vote at the convention on the question of the party's leadership.  There was a split between the parliamentary caucus and the party executive on the convention floor. Coldwell stepped down as leader, and Argue replaced him, becoming the party's final national leader.
 
As far back as 1941, Coldwell wanted Douglas to succeed him in leading the national CCF (at that time, it was obvious that Coldwell would assume the national leadership in the near future). When the time came for the "New Party" to form, in 1961, Coldwell pressured Douglas to run for the leadership. Coldwell did not trust Argue, and many in the CCF leadership thought that Argue had already been secret meetings with the Liberals to merge the "New Party" with the Liberal Party of Canada. As well, it was thought by Coldwell and Douglas that Lewis would not be a viable alternative to Argue because he likely could not defeat Argue because he had no parliamentary seat but also, and probably more importantly, his role as party disciplinarian over the years had made him so many enemies that he might not win the leadership. Douglas, after much consultation, with Coldwell, Lewis, and his caucus, reluctantly decided in June 1961 to contest the leadership of the New Party. He handily defeated Argue on August 3, 1961. Six months later Argue crossed the floor and became a Liberal.

Coldwell was unenthusiastic about the movement to merge the CCF with the Canadian Labour Congress and create the "New Party", but he joined the New Democratic Party at its founding in 1961, and remained an elder statesman in the party until his death in 1974.

Later life
In 1964, he became a member of the Queen's Privy Council for Canada, thereby allowing him to be referred to by the honorific "The Honourable" for the rest of his life. Also in 1964, he was appointed to the House of Commons Advisory Committee on Election Finances chaired by Liberal cabinet minister Judy LaMarsh. In 1966, Prime Minister Lester B. Pearson appointed him to the Royal Commission on Security (the "Mackenzie Commission"), dealing with the RCMP and security issues that arose from the Munsinger Affair. When Douglas retired as the NDP's leader in April 1971, the party established the Douglas–Coldwell Foundation in Ottawa as its parting gift to both Douglas and his aging friend and political mentor, Coldwell. The foundation's mandate was to be an intellectual thinktank that incubated ideas and policies for the NDP. On November 5, 1972, Coldwell was honoured by St. Francis Xavier University with a Doctor of Laws degree.

On July 6, 1967, he was appointed a Companion of the Order of Canada. He was invested into the order on November 24, 1967, for "his contribution as a Parliamentarian." It is noteworthy that his Order of Canada medal was sold at auction in 1981, the first time the Order of Canada is known to have been sold. It ended up in auction due to his will not specifying what to do with his various medals, so his son sold them to a private collector, who then put them up for auction. That same year, the Douglas-Coldwell Foundation purchased the medals back for about $10,000 so that they could be displayed in the Tommy Douglas House museum in Regina.

In his final years, his health was deteriorating. He was living alone in his home in Ottawa, with the assistance of his housekeeper, Beatrice Bramwell. He died at 85 in the Ottawa Civic Hospital after he had suffered two heart attacks on August 25, 1974. He had given specific orders not to perform "heroic measures" to keep him alive.

He is portrayed in the 2006 CBC Television special Prairie Giant: The Tommy Douglas Story by Aidan Devine.

Archives 
There is a M. J. Coldwell fonds at Library and Archives Canada. Archival reference number is R4291.

Notes

References

Sources

Further reading

External links
M.J. Coldwell biography (circa. 1953)
 

1888 births
1974 deaths
Canadian Anglicans
Canadian Christian socialists
Anglican socialists
Companions of the Order of Canada
Co-operative Commonwealth Federation MPs
20th-century Canadian legislators
English emigrants to Canada
Members of the House of Commons of Canada from Saskatchewan
Members of the King's Privy Council for Canada
NDP and CCF leaders
Regina, Saskatchewan city councillors
People from Seaton, Devon
Leaders of the Saskatchewan CCF/NDP